Red Skies Over Europe is a 2004 action video game developed by Polish studio Interactive Vision and published by Akella. The game is set in the Eastern Front conflict between the Axis Powers Luftwaffe and the Soviet Air Force in World War II. The player can fly in aircraft such as the MiG-3, Yak-9, IL-2, Messerschmitt Bf 109, Junkers Ju 87. There are 40 missions in the game.

References

2004 video games
Combat flight simulators
Video games developed in Poland
Video games set in the Soviet Union
Windows games
Windows-only games
World War II video games
Akella games